Maryhill is a locality in Mangalore city, Karnataka, India. It is one of the upscale residential localities of Mangalore. Maryhill, along with Bondel houses many highrise buildings and is also developing rapidly as a commercial center. Tulu is the main language which is spoken and understood by everyone in this locality. Konkani, Kannada are the other languages that is commonly used. Maryhill is predominantly a residential area and famous for Helipad. Many people use the Helipad daily for morning and evening walk. There are around 10 to 15 youth who enthusiastically gather at Maryhill helipad every Sunday at 8 am to fly their radio controlled aircraft. Instructors in the group train their pupils to fly these aircraft and also to operate radio-controlled motor cars.

Educational Institutions in Maryhill 
Mount Carmel Central School
Vikas Pre-University College, Mangalore
Infant Jesus Higher primary school
Opa Schooling- Preschool ( Nursery, Playgroup)

Religious places 
Maryhill Chapel - used by sisters of the Apostolic Carmel located exactly in Maryhill.
Mahalasa Narayani Temple: This temple is located between Maryhill and Padavinangadi.
Bandottu Kordabbu Daivastana: This is one of the local daivastana in the area. Kola ustav will be held every year in the month of January.

Notable Tourist spots nearby
Kadri Park, Kadri, Mangalore - 3 km
Bejai Museum, Bejai, Mangalore - 4 km
Aloyseum, Hampankatta, Mangalore - 6 km
St. Aloysius Chapel, Hampankatta, Mangalore - 6 km
Pilikula Nisargadhama, Mangalore - 9 km
Tannirbhavi Beach, Mangalore- 11 km
Panambur Beach,  Mangalore - 11 km
Ullal beach, Ullal, Mangalore - 14 km
NITK Beach, Surathkal, Mangalore - 17 km
Sasihithlu Beach, Mukka, Mangalore - 23 km

Accessibility 
Maryhill is well connected by public transport. There are several city buses from the main bus stop in statebank, Mangalore and other parts of the city.

Nearest Railway Stations:
Mangalore Central railway station, Hampankatta, Mangalore - 7 km
Mangalore Junction railway station, Kankanady, Mangalore - 8 km
Surathkal railway station, Surathkal, Mangalore - 15 km

Nearest Airport:
 Mangalore International Airport (India) - 9 km

Other important places
Helipad
Excise Office
Landlinks Pinnacle A & B Apartments

See also 
 Kadri, Mangalore
 Bejai

Localities in Mangalore